The GT Tour is a format which contains different motorsports championships in France.
They are 8 different series at GT Tour events:

FFSA GT Championship
French F4 Championship
Porsche Carrera Cup France
Peugeot RCZ Racing Cup
SEAT Leon Supercopa France
Renault Clio Cup France
Mitjet Series 1300 Lights
Mitjet Series 2L

Auto racing series in France